| manageryears10 = 2021-2022
| managerclubs10 = AS Rejiche

Ferid Ben Belgacem is a Tunisian football manager.

References

Year of birth missing (living people)
Living people
Tunisian football managers
EGS Gafsa managers
Club Athlétique Bizertin managers
Stade Tunisien managers
CS Hammam-Lif managers
AS Gabès managers
Tunisian expatriate football managers
Expatriate football managers in Saudi Arabia
Tunisian expatriate sportspeople in Saudi Arabia